Ildaura Murillo-Rohde (September 6, 1920 – September 5, 2010) was a Panamanian nurse, professor, academic, tennis instructor, and organizational administrator. She founded the National Association of Hispanic Nurses in 1975.

Murillo-Rohde specialized in psychiatric nursing and held academic appointments at several universities. She was a World Health Organization consultant to the government of Taiwan and was named a Permanent UN Representative to UNICEF for the International Federation of Business and Professional Women.

She was named a Living Legend of the American Academy of Nursing in 1994.

Early life
Ildaura Murillo-Rohde was born on September 6, 1920, in Panama. She came to the United States in 1945. She completed a nursing diploma from the Medical and Surgical Hospital School of Nursing in 1948. She earned an undergraduate degree in the teaching and supervision of psychiatric nursing from Teachers College, Columbia University. She earned an MA in teaching and curriculum development and an MEd in education and administration, both from Columbia. In 1971, Murillo-Rohde was the first Hispanic nurse awarded a PhD from New York University (NYU).

Career 
Murillo-Rohde was dedicated to the Hispanic population in her work as a psychiatric nurse and focused on cultural awareness in nursing practice. In her article Family Life Among Mainland Puerto Ricans in New York City Slums, she stressed that there could be a “culture within a culture” and that a nurse must know each culture well in order to provide the best care.

Murillo-Rohde became an associate dean at the University of Washington and was the first Hispanic nursing dean at NYU. Murillo-Rohde founded the National Association of Spanish-Speaking Spanish-Surnamed Nurses (NASSSN), known as the National Association of Hispanic Nurses (NAHN) after 1979, and served as its first president. In 1991, David Dinkins appointed Murillo-Rohde to a commission that examined the quality of care at New York City hospitals. In 1994, she was named a Living Legend of the American Academy of Nursing.

Death 
Murillo-Rohde died in Panama on September 5, 2010, one day before her 90th birthday.

Legacy 
NAHN awards a scholarship and an educational excellence award in her honor. To mark the start of National Hispanic Heritage Month for 2021, the Google Doodle for September 15, 2021 pays homage to Dr. Murillo-Rohde.

See also
List of Living Legends of the American Academy of Nursing

References

American nursing administrators
1920 births
2010 deaths
Nursing school deans
Nursing researchers
Nursing educators
Steinhardt School of Culture, Education, and Human Development alumni
Teachers College, Columbia University alumni
Panamanian nurses
Panamanian academic administrators
Panamanian women academics
Panamanian emigrants to the United States